Żaneta Glanc (born 11 March 1983 in Poznań) is a female discus thrower from Poland.

She finished fourth at the 2009 World Championships and second at the 2009 World Athletics Final. She won the silver medal at the 2009 Summer Universiade. She also competed at the 2008 Olympic Games, but recorded no mark.  At the 2012 Olympic Games, she threw 59.88 but did not reach the final.

Her personal best is 65.34 metres, achieved in May 2012 in Halle.

Competition record

References

External links 
 
 
 
 

1983 births
Living people
Polish female discus throwers
Athletes (track and field) at the 2008 Summer Olympics
Athletes (track and field) at the 2012 Summer Olympics
Athletes (track and field) at the 2016 Summer Olympics
Olympic athletes of Poland
Sportspeople from Poznań
Universiade medalists in athletics (track and field)
Universiade gold medalists for Poland
Universiade silver medalists for Poland
Medalists at the 2009 Summer Universiade
Medalists at the 2011 Summer Universiade